Mountain Ok may be:
Mountain Ok people
Mountain Ok languages